Zangdar (also Romanized as Zangdār, Zang-i-Dār, and Zang-e Dar; also known as Zangī Dar and Zangī Darreh) is a village in Kuhsar Rural District, in the Central District of Shazand County, Markazi Province, Iran. At the 2006 census, its population was 344, in 78 families.

References 

Populated places in Shazand County